Penitent Magdalene is a 1576–1578 painting by El Greco depicting Mary Magdalene, produced during his first period in Toledo and showing the major influence of Titian on him at that time. It is now in the Museum of Fine Arts in Budapest.

Variants
A c. 1577 version is now in the Worcester Art Museum, whilst a later c.1580–1585 version is in the Nelson-Atkins Museum of Art in Kansas City. A different composition on the subject from 1585–1590 is in the Cau Ferrat Museum.

References

Bibliography 
  ÁLVAREZ LOPERA, José, El Greco, Madrid, Arlanza, 2005, Biblioteca «Descubrir el Arte», (colección «Grandes maestros»). 
  SCHOLZ-HÄNSEL, Michael, El Greco, Colonia, Taschen, 2003.

External links 
  

Paintings by El Greco
1578 paintings
El Greco
Paintings in the collection of the Museum of Fine Arts (Budapest)
Books in art
Skulls in art